In telecommunications, Bearer Service or data service is a service that allows transmission of information signals between network interfaces. These services give the subscriber the capacity required to transmit appropriate signals between certain access points, i.e. user network interfaces.

Bearer Service are Categorized by three types. They are categorized by accessing services, interworking requirements and Other General Attributes.

The bearer services include the following:
Rate adapted sub-rate information like circuit switched asynchronous and synchronous duplex data, 3009600 bits.
Speech and data swapping during a call, i.e. alternate speech and data.
Modem selection, i.e. selection of 3.1 kHz audio service when inter-working with ISDN.

Telecommunication services